Joe Melia ( Giovanni Philip William Melia;
 23 January 1935, Camden, London - 20 October 2012, Stratford-upon-Avon, Warwickshire) was a British actor.

Educated at the City of Leicester Boys' Grammar School and Downing College, Cambridge, where he read English, he first came to notice in Peter Nichols’s A Day in the Death of Joe Egg (Glasgow Citizens, 1967).

Selected filmography

Film

Television

nReferences

External links
Obituary, The Guardian, 7 November 2012

1935 births
2012 deaths
Alumni of Downing College, Cambridge
People educated at City of Leicester Boys' Grammar School
English male film actors
English male television actors
Male actors from London
20th-century English male actors
21st-century English male actors